Robert Levithan (April 11, 1951 - May 3, 2016), was an American writer and HIV/AIDS activist who has had a significant influence on LGBT culture. Levithan has been on the forefront of the reaction to the HIV/AIDS epidemic since the early Eighties. Levithan wrote prolifically on living with HIV and other issues related to LGBT culture on both Advocate.com and GoodMenProject.com. He died of cancer in 2016. He was gay.

Early years
Levithan was born on the island of Manhattan on April 11, 1951, the third son of Alice and Lou Levithan. He was raised in Englewood, New Jersey, attending public schools K - 12 and graduated from Dwight Morrow High School in 1969. He died on May 13, 2016 at the age of 65.

AIDS crisis
In 1984 Levithan trained at GMHC as a buddy and began volunteer work with seriously ill patients.  In 1986, he founded an alternative support group, The Healing Circle, and became actively involved, eventually leading groups.  By 1987 the group had several hundred attendees at 3 weekly groups, representing an alternative to the mainstream agencies which were preparing people to die.  The Manhattan Center for Living was formed and then in 1991 Levithan began working as a counselor, group facilitator, and later, board member at Friends in Deed.

References

1951 births
2016 deaths
American activists
American spiritual writers
HIV/AIDS activists

Dwight Morrow High School alumni
People from Englewood, New Jersey
American gay writers